Râiosu River may refer to:

 Râiosu, a tributary of the Buda in Argeș County
 Râiosul, a tributary of the Câlniștea in Giurgiu County